Ahmadabad (also Romanized as Aḩmadābād) is a village in Dodangeh-ye Olya Rural District, Ziaabad District, Takestan County, Qazvin Province, Iran. At the 2006 census, its population was 39, in 10 families.

References 

Populated places in Takestan County